Jitka Moučková (born 6 July 1979) is a Czech actress and dubbing artist. She has played parts at the Musical Theatre Karlín and the National Theatre in Prague. Among other roles, she has dubbed Penny in The Big Bang Theory for Czech television audiences.

Selected filmography 
ROMing (2007)
The Devil's Bride (2011)
Lída Baarová (2016)

References

External links

1979 births
Living people
Czech film actresses
Czech stage actresses
Czech voice actresses
People from Kladno
21st-century Czech actresses